Mastiphal is a Polish black metal band.  It was founded in Katowice in 1992, initially named Dissolution, thanks to effort of Rafał "Flauros" Góral (later a vocalist for Darzamat) and Cymeris (in latter years associated with Iperyt).  A year later the band has been renamed to Mastiphal.

They released one LP: For A Glory Of All Evil Spirits Rise For Victory (1996), two demos: Sowing Profane Seed (1994) and Promo'96; and an EP Seed of Victory (1998), after which the band split up.

It was reactivated in 2009.  In September that year a Białystok label Witching Hour Productions released a two-disc issue Damnatio Memoriae, including all past songs by Mastiphal.  In  2010 the band was joined by guitar players Damian "Daamr" Kowalski and "Opressor", and also percussist Paweł "Senator" Nowak.

Discography 
 Sowing Profane Seed (1994, Baron Records)
 For a Glory of all Evil Spirits, Rise for Victory (1995, Baron Records, Nocturn Records)
 Seed of Victory (1996, Vox Mortiis)
 Czarne zastępy – W hołdzie KAT ("Black Hosts – tribute to KAT") (1998, Pagan Records)
 A Tribute to Hell (1998, Full Moon Production)
 Damnatio Memoriae (2009, Witching Hour Productions)
 Parvzya (2011, Witching Hour Productions)

External links 
 Mastiphal on Myspace

Polish black metal musical groups
Musical quintets